was a Japanese film and television director.

Career
Born in Tokyo, Onchi graduated from Keio University and joined the Toho studios. He debuted as a director with Wakai ōkami (1961), and first made a name for himself directing youth films such as Izu no odoriko (1967). After turning freelance, he also worked in Japanese television, serving for instance as the main director for Kizu darake no tenshi, an influential TV drama from the 1970s.

Onchi won the award for Best Director at the 28th Hochi Film Award for Warabi no kō. He died from lung cancer on 20 January 2022, at the age of 88.

Filmography
Wakai ōkami (1961)
Izu no odoriko (1967)
 Toward the Terra (1980)
 Warabi no kō (2003)

Notes

References
 
 

1933 births
2022 deaths
Japanese film directors
Japanese television directors
Japanese screenwriters
Keio University alumni
People from Tokyo